Paddington Old Cemetery is a civic cemetery that opened in 1855.  It is located in Willesden Lane, Kilburn, in the London Borough of Brent. It is also known as Paddington Cemetery or Willesden Lane Cemetery. It is Grade II listed, Entry Number:1001542.

History 
In 1855 Paddington Burial Board purchased 24 acres of rural land in Willesden. Cemetery designer Thomas Little created a horse-shoe tree-lined path layout. On each side of the entrance he built lodges and in the centre, two Gothic-style chapels (grade II listed, Entry Number:1359002). Its original formation was in a rural landscape which later became a green open space. There is a war memorial by the western entrance. There are 213 graves for casualties of World War I and World War II. The Goetze Memorial, erected by artist Sigismund Goetze in memory of his parents, is Grade II listed, Entry Number:1389534.

The City of Westminster sold the cemetery to Brent Council in 1986 and still manages it today (2000). Paddington Cemetery received a Special Commendation in the 'Cemetery of the Year Awards' in 1999, the cemetery office being praised for their work in reinstating the cemetery from closed status to local use. To celebrate the Millennium in 2000 new trees were planted and there is an apiary within the cemetery that produces 'Tombstone honey'.

Notable burials 

 Edward Spencer Beesly (1831–1915) an English positivist and historian; President of the London Positivist Society from 1878 to 1900
 Michael Bond (1926–2017) a British author best known for his Paddington Bear books.
 Jabez Burns (1805–1876) a temperance reformer and preacher.
 Orlando Jewitt (1799–1869) a British architectural wood-engraver.
 Norman Kerr (1834–1899) a physician who in 1879 founded the Society for the Study and Cure of Inebriety and was the first president.
 Danny Maher (1881–1916) was an American Hall of Fame jockey who also became a Champion jockey in Great Britain.
 Arthur Orton (1834–1898) who claimed to be Sir Roger Tichborne, who had been lost at sea in 1854, to claim his inheritance.
 Cuthbert Ottaway (1850–1878) a pioneer English footballer.
 Dr Severin Wielobycki (1793–1893) homeopath

Gallery

References

External links 
 Official website
 The Commonwealth War Graves Commission
 
 Friends of Paddington Old Cemetery

Paddington Old Cemetery
Paddington Old Cemetery
Paddington Old Cemetery
Paddington Old Cemetery